Brady Township is the name of some places in the U.S. state of Pennsylvania:
Brady Township, Butler County, Pennsylvania
Brady Township, Clarion County, Pennsylvania
Brady Township, Clearfield County, Pennsylvania
Brady Township, Huntingdon County, Pennsylvania
Brady Township, Lycoming County, Pennsylvania

See also 
 Bradys Bend Township, Armstrong County, Pennsylvania

Pennsylvania township disambiguation pages